Walter F. Dukes (June 23, 1930 – March 13, 2001) was a center for the New York Knicks (1955–1956), Minneapolis Lakers (1956–1957) and Detroit Pistons (1957–1963). He played college basketball for the Seton Hall Pirates. 

Born  in Rochester, New York, Dukes played high school basketball at Seton Hall Preparatory School, and attended Seton Hall University. He graduated from New York Law School in 1960.

Dukes helped the Lakers win the 1956–57 NBA Western Division in his second season.  While with the Pistons, he was named to the 1960 and 1961 NBA All-Star West Teams.  Dukes averaged double figures in rebounds in six of his eight seasons in the NBA, and had career averages of 11.3 rebounds per game and 10.4 points per game.

Dukes led the NBA in personal fouls in 1958 (311) and 1959 (332) and led the NBA in disqualifications four consecutive seasons between 1958–59 and 1961–62 — still an NBA record.  His 121 career disqualifications (in only eight seasons) rank second in the NBA to Vern Mikkelsen, and he holds the record for the highest career percentage of games fouled out (21.9%) for any player with over 400 games played.

On March 14, 2001, Dukes was found dead in his apartment in Detroit, Michigan. According to a police spokesman, he had been dead for about a month when his body was found. He died of natural causes, aged 70.

References

1930 births
2001 deaths
All-American college men's basketball players
American men's basketball players
Basketball players from New Jersey
Centers (basketball)
Detroit Pistons players
Harlem Globetrotters players
Minneapolis Lakers players
National Basketball Association All-Stars
New York Knicks draft picks
New York Knicks players
New York Law School alumni
Seton Hall Pirates men's basketball players
Seton Hall Preparatory School alumni